José Neto  may refer to:

 José Neto (basketball), Brazilian basketball coach, former head coach of the Brazil national basketball team
 José Neto (musician), jazz fusion guitarist
 José Neto (footballer), Portuguese footballer who played for S.L. Benfica
 Jose Franca Neto (born 1955), Brazilian footballer who mostly played in the U.S.